Sir John Lewis (born 1580) was a Welsh politician who sat in the House of Commons from 1604 to 1611.

Lewis was the son of James ap Lewis of Abernant-bychan. He was admitted at Jesus College, Oxford on  22 April 1598, aged 17, and entered the Inner Temple in November 1598. He was  knighted on 29 June 1604.

In 1604, he was elected Member of Parliament for Cardiganshire. He was High Sheriff of Cardiganshire  in 1609 and again in 1633. He became possessed of Coedmawr (Coedmor). 
 
Lewis died in 1643 or in about 1656.

Lewis married Bridget Pryse, the eldest daughter of Sir Richard Pryse of Gogerddan.

References

1580 births
Year of death missing
Members of the Parliament of England (pre-1707) for constituencies in Wales
Alumni of Jesus College, Oxford
High Sheriffs of Cardiganshire
Members of the Inner Temple
17th-century Welsh politicians
English MPs 1604–1611